Notable events of 2009 in webcomics.

Events

New England Webcomics Weekend was first held March 20–22.

Awards
Eisner Awards, "Best Webcomic" won by Carla Speed McNeil's Finder.
Harvey Awards, "Best Online Comics Work" won by Scott O. Brown, Steve Ellis, and David Gallaher's High Moon.
Ignatz Awards, "Outstanding Online Comic" won by Cayetano Garza's Year of the Rat.
Joe Shuster Awards, "Outstanding WebComic Creator/Creative Team" won by Cameron Stewart, creator of Sin Titulo.
Cybils Awards for Young Adult Books, "Graphic Novel" won by Tom Siddell's Gunnerkrigg Court: Orientation.
Hugo Award for Best Graphic Story won by Kaja Foglio, Phil Foglio, and Cheyenne Wright's Girl Genius, Volume 8.

Webcomics started

January 14 — Forming by Jesse Moynihan
January 21 — Doc and Raider by Sean Martin
February 1 —  Amalgam by Maya Zankoul
April 13 — Homestuck by Andrew Hussie
April 18 — Kiwi Blitz by Mary Cagle
July 13 — One-Punch Man by One
July 6 — The Oatmeal by Matthew Inman
July  — Hyperbole and a Half by Allie Brosh
August 15 — Drive: the scifi comic by Dave Kellett
September 4 — Guilded Age by T Campbell, Erica Henderson and Phil Khan
September 21 — Bad Machinery by John Allison
October 31 — Death-Day by Sam Hiti and Joseph Midthun
October — La Morté Sisters by Tony Trov, Johnny Zito and Christine Larsen
December 25 — Axe Cop by Malachai Nicolle and Ethan Nicolle
 Writer J by Oh Seong-dae

Webcomics ended
 Chopping Block by Lee Adam Herold, 2000 – 2009
 The Pain – When Will It End? by Tim Kreider, 2000 – 2009
 Scary Go Round by John Allison, 2002 – 2009
 Ugly Hill by Paul Southworth, 2005 – 2009 
 Pink Lady by Yeon Woo and Seo Na, 2007 – 2009
 Problem Sleuth by Andrew Hussie, 2008 – 2009
 Oh My Gods! by Shivian Montar Balaris, 2002 – 2009
 DAR'' by Erika Moen, 2003 – 2009

References

 
Webcomics by year